N4, N-4, or N.4 may refer to:

Computing
 N4 (NHS), the successor to the N3 NHS computer network 
 NASCAR Racing 4, a NASCAR sim by Papyrus and Sierra
 N4, a Markup Language

Roads
 N4 highway (Philippines)
 N4 (Bangladesh)
 N4 road (Belgium), a road connecting Brussels and Arlon
 N4 road (France) 
 N4 road (Gabon)
 N4 road (Ireland), a National Primary Route connecting Dublin, Mullingar, Longford, Carrick-on-Shannon, and Sligo
 N4 road (Luxembourg)
 N4 road (Senegal)
 N4 road (South Africa), a road connecting the Botswana border, Pretoria, and the Mozambique border
 N4 road (Spain), a National Primary Route connecting Madrid and Andalusia
 N4 road (Switzerland)
 Nebraska Highway 4, a state highway in the U.S. state of Nebraska

Transport
 Fairey N.4, a British reconnaissance flying boat of the 1920s
 LNER Class N4, a British steam locomotive class
 Minerva Airlines, IATA airline designator
 SP&S Class N-4, a steam locomotive class
 USS N-4 (SS-56), a 1916 N-class coastal defense submarine of the United States Navy

Other
 , an unstable molecule of nitrogen (tetranitrogen)
 N4, a postcode district in the N postcode area of London
 N4, a Drum & Bass / Hardcore record label run by Pete Cannon. Named after the N4 London postcode district
 N4 (television channel), a community television channel in Akureyri, Iceland
 Washburn N4, an electric guitar
 The second level in the Japanese Language Proficiency Test
 Nexus 4, an Android smartphone
 N4, TSMC's 4 nm semiconductor process node

See also

N04 may refer to :
 ATC code N04 Anti-parkinson drugs, a subgroup of the Anatomical Therapeutic Chemical Classification System
 Griswold Airport FAA LID
 Nephrotic syndrome ICD-10 code
 N°4, a shortening for Number Four (disambiguation)